The North Carolina General Assembly 2017–2018 was the 153rd State legislature that first convened on January 11, 2017. Members of the North Carolina Senate and the North Carolina House of Representatives were elected on November 7, 2016. This legislature was in session from January 11, 2017 through June 30, 2017. Additional sessions were held on August 3, August 18 to 25, August 28 to 31, and October 4 to 17 in 2017. The 2018 session was held from January 10, 2018 through July 4, 2018.

Legislation
This legislature created 360 Session laws (146 in 2018, 214 in 2017).  Some of the Session laws included an act to amend the Constitution of North Carolina to require photo identification in order to vote (H1092), an act to amend the constitution to establish a bipartisan board of ethics and elections enforcement (H4), and several acts dealing with Hurricane Florence recovery.

House of Representatives

House leadership

The General Assembly House of Representatives consisted of representatives from the 120 State districts in North Carolina.

House members

The 120 members of the State House of Representatives for 20172018 included 75 Republicans, 45 Democrats, 30 women, 24 African Americans, one Native American (Charles Graham), and 25 new members.

Notes:

Senate

Senate leadership
The Senate leadership is as follows, as was shown on the North Carolina Legislature web page in 2017.

Membership

↑: Member was first appointed to office.

Notes:

References

External links

2017
General Assembly
General Assembly
 2017
 2017
2017 U.S. legislative sessions
2018 U.S. legislative sessions